William Scott Landay (born July 23, 1963) is an American novelist and former lawyer.

Early life and education 
Landay graduated from the Roxbury Latin School in Boston, Yale University and Boston College Law School.

Career 
Prior to becoming a writer, Landay served for seven years as an Assistant District Attorney in Middlesex County, Massachusetts.

His first novel, Mission Flats, was awarded the John Creasey Dagger (now called the New Blood Dagger) as the best debut crime novel of 2003 by the British Crime Writers Association.

His second novel, The Strangler, was shortlisted for the Strand Magazine Critics Award as the best crime novel of 2007.

Landay's third novel, Defending Jacob, was released in January 2012. It was well received by critics and became an immediate New York Times best seller. It was awarded the Strand Magazine Critics Award for best mystery novel of 2012 and was nominated for several other awards, including the Barry Award and Hammett Prize, both for best crime novel; the International Thriller Writers Award for best thriller; the Harper Lee Prize for Legal Fiction; and the Goodreads Choice Award for both best mystery/thriller and best author.

Personal life
He lives with his wife and two sons in Boston.

References

Further reading 
 Malandrinos, Cheryl C., "Interview: William Landay, Author of Defending Jacob", Blogcritics, February 13, 2012

External links
 Official site

1963 births
Living people
21st-century American novelists
20th-century American lawyers
American crime fiction writers
American male novelists
Boston College Law School alumni
Writers from Boston
Yale University alumni
Roxbury Latin School alumni
21st-century American male writers
Novelists from Massachusetts